PacBSD (formerly known as Arch BSD) was an operating system based on Arch Linux, but uses the FreeBSD kernel instead of the Linux kernel and the GNU userland.
The PacBSD project began on an Arch Linux forum thread in April 2012. It aims to provide an Arch-like user environment, utilizing the OpenRC init system, the pacman package manager, and rolling-release.

See also
 Arch Hurd: A similar project with GNU/Hurd as its base
 Arch Linux
 FreeBSD

References

Berkeley Software Distribution
Free software operating systems
Unix variants